D55 state road in the eastern part of Croatia connects the cities and towns of Vukovar, Vinkovci, Županja to the state road network of Croatia, and most notably to the A3 motorway. The route comprises some urban intersections, mostly in the city of Vinkovci.

The D55 state road intersects the Vukovar-Srijem County exactly through an area that connects the regions of Slavonia and Syrmia.

The road, as well as all other state roads in Croatia, is managed and maintained by Hrvatske ceste, state-owned company.

Traffic volume 

Traffic is regularly counted and reported by Hrvatske ceste, operator of the road.

Road junctions and populated areas

Maps

Sources

D055
D055